Nannoscincus is a genus of small skinks, lizards in the family Scincidae. The genus is endemic to New Caledonia.

Species
The following 12 species are recognized as being valid.

Nannoscincus exos  - northern dwarf skink
Nannoscincus fuscus 
Nannoscincus garrulus 
Nannoscincus gracilis  - New Caledonian gracile dwarf skink, gracile dwarf skink, slender elf skink
Nannoscincus greeri  - Greer's elf skink 
Nannoscincus hanchisteus  - Pindai dwarf skink
Nannoscincus humectus  - Forêt Plate dwarf skink
Nannoscincus koniambo 
Nannoscincus manautei 
Nannoscincus mariei  - earless dwarf skink
Nannoscincus rankini  - Rankin's elf skink
Nannoscincus slevini  - Slevin's elf skink

Nota bene: A binomial authority in parentheses indicates that the species was originally described in a genus other than Nannoscincus.

References

Further reading
Günther A (1872). "On some new Species of Reptiles and Fishes collected by J. Brenchley, Esq." Ann. Mag. Nat. Hist., Fourth Series 10 (60): 418–426. (Nannoscincus, new genus, p. 421).

 
Endemic fauna of New Caledonia
Skinks of New Caledonia
Lizard genera
Taxa named by Albert Günther